Enoch Thorsgard (March 30, 1917 – December 16, 2015) was an American politician who was a member of the North Dakota House of Representatives.

He was born on a farm near Northwood, North Dakota. He was the son of Arne Thorsgaard (1874-1948) and Clara (Markve) Thorsgaard (1888-1985). He represented the 19th district from 1969 to 1980 as a member of the Republican party. He was an alumnus of North Dakota Agriculture College and a farmer and cattle rancher near Northwood, North Dakota. He died on December 16, 2015 in Northwood, North Dakota.

References

1917 births
2015 deaths
People from Grand Forks County, North Dakota
Farmers from North Dakota
Ranchers from North Dakota
Republican Party members of the North Dakota House of Representatives
North Dakota State University alumni
American Lutherans
American people of Norwegian descent
20th-century Lutherans